Danan: The Jungle Fighter is an action/platform-adventure game for the Sega Master System in Brazil and Europe in 1990. The name is taken from a fictional character, Danan, set in an unknown wooded civilization.

Gameplay
The game borrows elements from multiple game genres, such as hack 'n slash action, vertical and horizontal platforming; non-linear level designs; an elaborate plot mostly untangled by talking to NPCs; item collection, summons (animal aid); levelling up. Although it contains some action-adventure and action role-playing video game mechanics, the emphasis falls more heavily on action and platforming. The player can walk, jump, duck, climb stairs, enter doors and thrust his knife into enemies.

The game is divided into four relatively nonlinear "rounds". The player character Danan must sometimes enter houses, through ladders inside he can enter the doors on the top floor, which is required to reach the higher plateaus and to advance further in particular areas. Exploration (caverns, sideways, ...) rewards the player with extra power-ups, most non-essential (exception: upgraded knives). In contrast to games like Metroid, previously inaccessible areas are not available to backtrack to after powering up. Especially in the third maze-like round, the timer - which at the beginning of each round is set to 100 seconds, though 30 seconds can be added by picking up a clock symbol - regularly encourages the player to take the fastest road to an end level boss.

Danan obtains power-ups through treasure chests, whose content is revealed upon touching them. Little and large stars increase the player's "experience" or maximum health: two types of meat ("beef" and "chicken") replenish the player's actual "strength" or health; upgraded knives (required to beat certain bosses) and clocks. Danan can also collect animal icons that enable him to summon three animal friends: the armadillo helps him fight enemies, the eagle transports him to high places and the gorilla]restores 3/4 of one's strength. Though strictly not needed to finish the game, animal aid is a unique feature.

Reception

The game was described by game journalists and game bloggers as a cross between hack 'n slash action in the vein of Rastan, Golden Axe and The Legendary Axe, and action-adventures games like Lord of the Sword and Faxanadu.

References

External links

Master System games
Master System-only games
Sega video games
1990 video games
Video games developed in Japan